Jeevan Dhaara is a 1982 Indian Hindi-language film directed by T. Rama Rao. The film is a remake of the 1974 Tamil film Aval Oru Thodar Kathai. The film stars Rekha, Raj Babbar, Rakesh Roshan, Amol Palekar, Kanwaljit Singh and Simple Kapadia. The movie bridges the mainstream genre with Parallel Cinema. Rekha received a nomination for Filmfare Best Actress Award, the only nomination for the film.  She is credited with the film's box office success.

Plot
Sangeeta (Rekha) is a young, strong and idealistic girl. She is 25 years old, but unlike her contemporaries, she is still not married. The reason for this is her being a member of a poor family. Her father left the family; Her mother is an old homemaker; Her younger sister Geeta (Madhu Kapoor) is a young widow; Her nephews have to go to school while their father, her brother (Raj Babbar) is an inebriated and unemployed man. All the members of this family live in one little house. She is the only one who takes care of them. She is the only one who works to support the family. She is concerned for her nephews' future and makes her best to bring them up and educate them.

However, secretly, she dreams of the day when she could also have her own family, husband and children. A man who is secretly in love with her, Prem (Kanwaljit) follows her to her office every day. She reciprocates his feelings after she is unable to find him on the bus one day and this causes her to introspect. They start dating and she brings him home to meet her family. Her younger sister who was widowed at a young age and now lives with them, falls in love with Prem as well. When Sangeeta finds out about this she asks Prem to forget her and marry her sister indeed. He accepts and they are married.

After a few unfortunate incidents, involving her brother and her best friend's family, Sangeeta's boss asks her to marry him. Her boss, (played by Rakesh Roshan) offers Sangeeta's brother a job in his company and the family begin preparations for the wedding. However, on the day of the wedding Sangeeta's brother is killed by a goon he owed money too and Sangeeta breaks off her marriage to continue living with her family to financially support them. The film ends on a tragic note with Sangeeta telling the bus conductor she used to make small talk with on her way to her office every day that a woman who has a mother, a widowed sister-in-law and three children to take care of and support cannot dream of a life for individual self.

Cast
Rekha as Sangeeta 
Raj Babbar as Sangeeta's brother
Rakesh Roshan as Sangeeta's boss
Amol Palekar
Simple Kapadia
Kanwaljit Singh as Prem
Madhu Kapoor as Geeta

Music

References

External links
 

1982 films
1980s Hindi-language films
Hindi remakes of Tamil films
Films directed by T. Rama Rao
Films scored by Laxmikant–Pyarelal
Films about women in India